Through the Forest is a 2005 French film directed by Jean-Paul Civeyrac.

Plot

After a motorcycle accident, Renaud dies. His girlfriend Armelle (Camille Berthomier) can't forget him. Her sisters suggest she could go to a medium for help. Through this medium, Armelle encounters Hyppolite, who looks exactly like Renaud.

Cast
 Camille Berthomier as Armelle
 Aurelien Wiik as Hippolyte/ Renaud
 Morgane Hainaux as Roxane
 Alice Dubuisson as Bérénice
 Mireille Roussel as the medium
 Valérie Crunchant as medium's assistant

Release

July 2005 in Festival Paris Cinéma
September 2005 in Toronto International Film Festival
12 October 2005 France
22 October 2005 in London Film Festival

References

External links
DVD Toile(French)
À travers la forêt in Paris film festival’s programm
À travers la forêt in Toronto International Film Festival

2005 films
Films set in Paris
2000s French-language films
2000s fantasy drama films
French fantasy drama films
2005 drama films
2000s French films